Voldemar Kuslap (born 24 September 1937) is an Estonian opera and operetta singer (baritone) and occasional actor.

Biography 
He was born in 1937 in the city of Oudova in the RSFSR. In 1968, he graduated from the Tallinn State Conservatory. From 1965 to 2010, he sang in the choir of the Estonia Theatre. In total, he has done over 90 roles of opera and operettas. He has also appeared in several feature films, including Mis juhtus Andres Lapeteusega? (1966), Mehed ei nuta (1968), Valge laev (1970), Ooperiball (1974) and several television films and series.

Awards 
 1973: Meritorious Artist of the Estonian SSR
 1976: Georg Ots Award
 2001: Order of the White Star, V class.

References

Living people
1937 births
20th-century Estonian male opera singers
Estonian male musical theatre actors
Estonian male film actors
Estonian male television actors
20th-century Estonian male actors
21st-century Estonian male actors
Estonian Academy of Music and Theatre alumni
Recipients of the Order of the White Star, 5th Class
21st-century Estonian male opera singers